Carl R. Ajello (born August 22, 1932) was the 20th Attorney General of Connecticut, serving from 1975 to 1983.

Early life and career
Ajello was born in the city of Ansonia, Connecticut on August 22, 1932 to Carl and Kathryn Flanagan Ajello. He attended public schools in Ansonia before graduated with a Bachelor of Science from the University of Connecticut in 1953. He then went to graduate school, receiving a LL.B. and J.D.S. in law from New York University School of Law in 1956.

He later enlisted in the army, serving in the Judge Advocate General's Corps from 1957 to 1960. He was lieutenant when he first enlisted and honorably discharged as a captain.

Political and judicial career
Ajello, a member of the Democratic Party, was elected Justice of the Peace for the city of Ansonia for the 1960–1962 term; he also served as Corporation Counsel for Ansonia from 1965–1968. He was elected as a member of the Connecticut General Assembly in 1963, and served as the Assistant House Majority Leader in the 1967 session, House Majority Leader in the 1969 and 1971-1972 sessions; House Minority Leader in the 1973-1974 sessions.

He was elected Connecticut Attorney General in 1974 and re-elected in 1978, serving two terms from 1975–1983.
In 1978 he was elected, by his peers, as President of the National Association of Attorneys General.

Personal life
He lives in Hamden, Connecticut, having relocated from his original hometown of Ansonia, Connecticut, with his wife, Jacqueline. Both of their two children, Michele and Carl, are licensed attorneys. He's a member of multiple legal associations, including the Connecticut Bar Association.
He also has two grandsons and one granddaughter.

References

Connecticut lawyers
Connecticut Attorneys General
Connecticut Democrats
Connecticut state court judges
University of Connecticut alumni
1932 births
Living people